Swickard is a surname. Notable people with the surname include: 

Charles Swickard (1861–1929), German actor and director
Josef Swickard (1866–1940), German actor
Josh Swickard (born 1992), American model and actor
Lauren Swickard (born 1993), American actress, writer, and producer